Dennis Roberts may refer to:

 Dennis Roberts (footballer) (1918–2001), English footballer
 Dennis J. Roberts (1903–1994), American politician in Rhode Island